The Suicide Machines are an American punk rock band formed in March 1991 in Detroit, Michigan. During the course of their career, the band has released seven full-length albums on the labels Hollywood Records, Side One Dummy Records and Fat Wreck Chords, as well as several EPs and singles. They have experienced lineup changes over the years, all with founding member Jason Navarro as lead singer and front man. The contemporary lineup includes Ryan Vandeberghe on drums, Rich Tschirhart on bass and Justin Malek on guitar.

The band's musical style initially blended elements of punk rock, ska, and hardcore into genres popularly known as ska punk and ska-core, which characterized their first two albums. After a brief foray in a more radio friendly direction, they shifted back towards their mid-1990s style, bringing back ska punk, as well as a heavier ferocity with strong political overtones that draws from early hardcore punk. 

The Suicide Machines have achieved a high level of underground recognition through relentless touring, including multiple performances on the Warped Tour, Riot Fest and for many years their annual hometown Black Christmas festivals. 

In 2019, the band entered Marc Jacob Hudson's Rancho Recordo, with producer Roger Lima of Less Than Jake to record a new full-length album, Revolution Spring. The album was released March 27, 2020, via Fat Wreck Chords. A music video, "To Play Caesar (Is To Be Stabbed To Death)" from the Revolution Spring album was released in 2020 as well. 

In 2022, the band released a split 12" with Japanese band Coquettish, entitled "Gebo Gomi" on Bad Time Records.

Band history

1991-1995: Jack Kevorkian and the Suicide Machines
The Suicide Machines formed in 1991 in Detroit, Michigan under the original name Jack Kevorkian and the Suicide Machines. The band's original lineup consisted of Jason Navarro on vocals, Dan Lukacinsky on guitar, Jason Brake on bass, and Stefan Rairigh on drums. This lineup lasted a year until Bill Jennings replaced Rairigh, but he was soon replaced by Derek Grant. They recorded the band's first demos The Essential Kevorkian and Green World in 1993 and 1994, both released through their own label Sluggo's Old Skool Records. They also released the "Vans Song" 7" single on Youth Rendition Records. Brake left the group in 1994 and was briefly replaced by Dave Smith until Royce Nunley joined as the new permanent bass player. The lineup of Navarro, Lukacinsky, Nunley, and Grant would last for the next four years. This lineup reduced the band's name to The Suicide Machines and recorded the Skank for Brains split album with The Rudiments.

1996-2001: Hollywood Records years
In 1995 the band signed to Hollywood Records. 1996 saw the release of their first album, Destruction by Definition. Its blend of punk rock and ska brought them national attention in the midst of the mid-1990s punk rock mainstream revival. The single "No Face" became a minor hit on modern rock radio stations and the album was supported through extensive touring across the United States. They released a follow-up in 1998 entitled Battle Hymns, which continued their ska punk style while incorporating more aggressive elements of hardcore punk and sociopolitical lyrics, with nearly all of its songs lasting under two minutes in length.

Following the release of Battle Hymns Grant left the band. He went on to play with numerous groups including Thoughts of Ionesco, The Vandals, Face to Face, and Telegraph before finding a permanent position in the Alkaline Trio. He was replaced by Erin Pitman for some touring before new permanent drummer Ryan Vandeberghe joined. In 2000 this lineup released The Suicide Machines, a more hard rock oriented effort that moved away from the ska influences of their earlier releases. They received some radio and video play for the single "Sometimes I Don't Mind" and performed on the Warped Tour that summer. In 2001 they released Steal This Record, which continued their exploration of pop punk style while mixing in elements of their earlier ska punk and hardcore albums.

2002-2005: Side One Dummy Records years
Following touring in support of Steal This Record bassist Nunley left The Suicide Machines to start his own band, Blueprint 76, and was replaced by Rich Tschirhart. The band also ended their contract with Hollywood Records, fulfilling their contractual obligations by releasing the compilation album The Least Worst of the Suicide Machines. They then moved to the independent label Side One Dummy Records. Their next album A Match and Some Gasoline, released in 2003, found the band abandoning the pop experimentations of their previous two albums and returning more to the ska punk and hardcore styles of their earlier years. They also continued exploring sociopolitical themes in songs such as "Did You Ever Get a Feeling of Dread?" and "Your Silence," which were critical of President George W. Bush's administration, its response to the September 11, 2001 terrorist attacks, and the wars in Afghanistan and Iraq. They toured internationally in support of the album and again performed on the Warped Tour.

In 2005 the band released the album War Profiteering is Killing Us All, which continued their political themes by openly attacking the Bush White House, the continuation of the Iraq War, and conservative Republicanism. Navarro also launched his own record label, Noise Riot Records, and released On the Eve of Destruction: 1991-1995, a compilation of the band's early EPs, singles, and demos.

2006-2008: Breakup, post-Suicide Machines activity and reformation
In 2006, while touring in support of War Profiteering is Killing Us All, the band abruptly broke up. Explanations given by the band members for this included Vandeberghe's desire to take a break from touring, which he did while friend Steve McCrumb filled for a performance at the Troubadour in Los Angeles on May 11. A tour of Mexico had been planned to follow this, and Navarro had suggested that the band perform its final shows that Christmas. However, interpersonal tensions came to a head after the Troubadour show when Lukacinsky refused to finish the tour. Lukacinsky himself further elaborated that the band had been planning to break up for some time.

Following the band's breakup Navarro and Vandeberghe continued working with Left in Ruin, a band they had started as a Suicide Machines side project and had worked on and off with for almost 6 years. Vandeberghe also joined the new band Hifi Handgrenades, and Tschirhart joined the band soon after. Later, Tschirhart formed another band called The A-Gang with former Mest drummer Nick Gigler.  Lukacinsky, meanwhile, started his own band Bayonetting the Wounded, who broke up after a few demo recordings.  He then moved to Japan and formed The One Thought Moment.  Early in 2008, Navarro formed another Detroit band, Hellmouth, in which he was back on lead vocals. In 2011, Navarro formed a new band called Break Anchor.
Bassist Rich Tschirhart also went on to form Bastardous with former Mest drummer, Nick Gigler. 
In 2013, drummer Ryan Vandeberghe teamed up with current and former members of Telegraph, Hellmouth, Hifi Handgrenades, ForDireLifeSake, and others to form the band Rebel Spies.

The Suicide Machines as a band were dormant for 3 years. Always willing to play benefits for various social activist causes, they reunited in 2009.

2009-2019: Reformation and Return
In late 2009, The Suicide Machines, with Hellmouth drummer Justin Malek replacing Lukacinsky on guitar, reformed for a benefit concert in Detroit.

On July 24, 2010, The Suicide Machines performed at St. Andrews Hall in Detroit. In October, The Suicide Machines performed at The Fest 9. On October 8, 2011 The Suicide Machines played Riot Fest 2011 in Chicago, as well as further shows throughout 2011.

The Suicide Machines played shows in Rochester, NY on May 19, followed by a performance at Pouzza Fest 2012, which took place May 18–20 in Montreal, Quebec, Canada.

Throughout 2012, 2013, and 2014, the band continued to play shows around the U.S., including their annual Black Christmas fests that they headline in their native Detroit each December.

On August 16, 2014, The Suicide Machines headlined with Lower Class Brats, Suburban Legends and Morning Glory for the Summergrind 2014 show in Denver, Colorado.

In April 2015, the band embarked on a two-week tour of the midwestern and east coast United States with former drummer Derek Grant, performing their 1996 album, 'Destruction By Definition', in its entirety at all shows.

The band played the Vans Warped Tour that summer for four dates: Cuyahoga Falls, Cincinnati, Noblesville, and Auburn Hills. On May 18, 2017, it was announced that The Suicide Machines would be headlining the New Generation of Ska Festival in Seoul, South Korea on August 19.

The band played a show with The Code on May 25, 2018 in Lawrenceville, PA and announced that they were working on new material, and would return with a new record. They performed some of the new songs at Black Christmas in Detroit in December 2018. The band played local shows throughout the year and occasionally did short tours and one-off shows overseas.
The band's final live performance before the global pandemic shutdown was a benefit for the charity Food Not Class in January 2020.

Black Christmas shows 2013-2019
For 7 consecutive years, the Suicide Machines hosted and headlined multi-band shows at The Majestic Complex in Detroit around the holidays. The yearly shows featured multiple stages and up to 18 additional bands. Over the years featured guests included Anti-Flag, The Black Dahlia Murder, Negative Approach, Meatmen, Mustard Plug, Wilson, Koffin Kats, ForDireLifeSake, Esham, Gangster Fun, Easy Action and many others.

2020-present: Revolution Spring & Gebo Gomi
In early 2020 Fat Wreck Chords announced the band's new album, Revolution Spring, would be released on March 27, 2020. On March 25, 2020, a stream of the album was posted to YouTube. Unfortunately, the onset of the worldwide Covid-19 pandemic prevented the band from touring to support the new release.
 
During the shutdown, the band instead filmed and streamed "The Suicide Machines Devil's Night 2020" on YouTube. 

The band returned to live in person performance in July 2021 with another benefit for the Food Not Class charity. 

In October 2021, they performed a Halloween themed show at Detroit City Distillery to celebrate the release of their Suicide Machines' signature bourbon, Well Whiskey Wishes.

2022 saw The Suicide Machines touring the UK and United States, including dates on the traveling Punk In Drublic music and craft beer festival. They also released a split 12" Gebo Gomi with Japanese band Coquettish, on Bad Time Records.

Band members

Current members
Jason "Jay" Navarro – vocals 
Ryan Vandeberghe – drums 
Rich Tschirhart – bass guitar, backing vocals 
Justin Malek – guitar

Former members
Dan Lukacinsky – guitar, backing vocals 
Jason "Jay" Brake – bass guitar 
Stefan Rairigh – drums 
Derek Grant – drums, backing vocals, keyboards 
Bill Jennings – drums 
Royce Nunley – bass, backing vocals 
Dave Smith – bass 
Erin Pitman – drums 
Danny Lore – bass

Timeline

Discography

The discography of The Suicide Machines consists of seven studio albums, one split album, two compilation albums, three EPs, four singles, two demos, and six music videos.

Studio albums

Split EP albums

Compilation albums

Extended plays

Singles

Demos

Music videos

Other appearances 
The following songs by The Suicide Machines were released on compilation and tribute albums. This is not an exhaustive list; songs that were first released on the band's albums, EPs, and singles are not included.

References

External links

Official Myspace profile
SideOneDummy records official profile

The unofficial band message board

Hollywood Records artists
Hardcore punk groups from Michigan
Musical groups from Detroit
Skate punk groups
American ska punk musical groups
Musical groups established in 1991
SideOneDummy Records artists
Fat Wreck Chords artists